Ari Cohen (born in Winnipeg, Manitoba) is a Canadian stage and television actor. He was a cast member of My Babysitter's a Vampire. He is from Winnipeg and attended the University of Manitoba, where he was an alumnus of the Black Hole Theatre Company.

Cohen is active in Canadian theatre, having worked with the Soulpepper Theatre Company (as Biff in Arthur Miller's Death of a Salesman and as Bobby Gould in David Mamet's Speed-the-Plow, both 2012), with the Harold Green Jewish Theatre Company (as uncle Louie in Neil Simon's Lost in Yonkers), as well as with the Vancouver Playhouse Theatre Company and many others.

On screen

References

External links
 

Living people
Canadian male film actors
Canadian male television actors
Male actors from Winnipeg
University of Manitoba alumni
Date of birth missing (living people)
Canadian male stage actors
Year of birth missing (living people)